CPHS may refer to:
 Cayman Prep and High School in Grand Cayman, Cayman Islands
 Cedar Park High School in Cedar Park, Texas
 Caldwell Parish High School in Columbia, LA
 Clover Park High School in Lakewood, Washington
 Crown Point High School in Crown Point, Indiana
 Boston University Center for Philosophy and History of Science